Iruña de Oca is a municipality located in the province of Álava, in the Basque Country, northern Spain. Iruña de Oca is the most populated municipality of the Cuadrilla de Añana, one of the seven comarcas of the province, more than 35% of the people of Añana live there.

Geography 
The municipality was created in 1976 from the merger of the following municipalities, administratively denominated consejos:
Nanclares de la Oca/Langraiz Oka (capital of the municipality)
Montevite/Mandaita
Ollávarre/Olabarri
Víllodas/Billoda
Trespuentes/Trasponde

Iruña de Oca is located in the central part of the Álava province, just 14 km far from Vitoria, the capital city of the Basque Country.

External links 
 IRUÑA DE OCA in the Bernardo Estornés Lasa - Auñamendi Encyclopedia 

Municipalities in Álava